The 1933 Allan Cup was the Canadian senior ice hockey championship for the 1932–33 season.

Final 
Best of 3
Moncton 3 Saskatoon 0
Moncton 2 Saskatoon 0

Moncton Hawks beat Saskatoon Quakers 2-0 on series.

External links
Allan Cup archives 
Allan Cup website

 
Allan Cup
Allan